Paul O'Brien (born 14 April 1978) is a South African-Australian actor. He is best known for his role as Jack Holden in the television soap opera Home and Away, for which he won the Logie Award for Most Popular New Male Talent in 2006.

Early life
Paul O'Brien was born in South Africa, and grew up in Australia. As a child he suffered from a stutter and blinking problem and was picked on for his thick South African accent. His nickname as a child was "toughie" as he was often getting into fights. He spent several years on the Gold Coast, with his family. He attended his first school, St Kevin's, in Benowa, and later attended Somerset and Marymount colleges.

Home and Away
O'Brien joined the regular cast as loveable cop Jack Holden in Home and Away and played the character between 2005 and 2009. His most notable storyline involved the on-again-off-again romance with Jodi Gordon's Martha Mackenzie.

During this time, O'Brien won the Logie Award for Most Popular New Male Talent in 2006, and was further nominated for the Silver Logie in 2007 and 2008.

O'Brien was named the runner-up, behind comedian Andy Lee in the 2006 Cleo Bachelor of the Year competition. In 2008, O'Brien took part in the third series of It Takes Two, an Australian reality show in which celebrities compete against each other by singing. O'Brien was partnered with pop singer Jade MacRae.  They finished in fourth position.

O'Brien established a fan base in 56 territories around the world from his four years on Home and Away.

Post-Home and Away
Paul made his stage debut in "Five Minute Call" by playwright Julia Britton at Melbourne's The Butterfly Club. Since, O'Brien appeared in the first of three Underbelly Files telemovies 'Tell Them Lucifer Was Here' playing a Melbourne detective who was gunned down whilst on patrol. However, he avoided many roles as he wanted to reinvent himself and not be typecast as the 'pin-up boy' or the 'nice cop'.

O'Brien began to pursue a film career, beginning with a part in John Doe: Vigilante (dir. Kelly Dolen) before securing the role of ex-assassin Ryan Teller in Message Man (dir. Corey Pearson, who went on to direct fellow Home and Away alum Jessica Falkholt in her final film, Harmony).

In October 2013, it was announced that he had joined the cast of Neighbours in the guest role of Eric Edwards.

Post Neighbours, O'Brien starred in The Subjects (dir. Robert Mond), short films Peacekeeper and Without A Shirt, before appearing in Project Eden: Vol I as Agent Williams.

In December 2017, O'Brien was cast as the lead opposite John Jarrett in the Christmas comedy Christmas Down Under, directed by Louis Mandylor of My Big Fat Greek Wedding fame. Christmas Down Under is due for release in 2018.

In 2018, O'Brien was cast opposite Catherine Bell in Hallmark's A Summer to Remember.

Also in 2018 he starred in the Indonesia set film Message Man as a ruthless hitman who comes out of retirement to avenge a poor Indonesian family who are being terrorized by modern-day child slavers. The film was well received & O'Brien received praise especially for the 'Jason Bourne' type fight scenes. The film has a score of 70% on the review website Rotten Tomatoes making a certified fresh rating.

Paul O'Brien Acting

Paul O'Brien launched his acting school, Paul O'Brien Acting, to help actors become working actors. O'Brien felt that a lot of what was taught to him was outdated or redundant in the world of film and television acting.

Based in South Yarra, Victoria, O'Brien has helped many of his students get agents, get auditions and book roles. He stands by the Flow Technique as being the most effective approach to acting and auditions.

Awards and nominations

Selected filmography

References

External links

1978 births
Australian male film actors
Australian male soap opera actors
Australian people of Irish descent
Australian television presenters
Living people
Logie Award winners
Place of birth missing (living people)
South African emigrants to Australia
South African people of Irish descent
Male actors from the Gold Coast, Queensland